Borkowice may refer to the following places in Poland:
Borkowice, Lower Silesian Voivodeship (south-west Poland)
Borkowice, Masovian Voivodeship (east-central Poland)
Borkowice, Greater Poland Voivodeship (west-central Poland)
Borkowice, Brzeg County in Opole Voivodeship (south-west Poland)
Borkowice, Kluczbork County in Opole Voivodeship (south-west Poland)
Borkowice, West Pomeranian Voivodeship (north-west Poland)